This is a list of electricity-generating power stations in the U.S. state of Iowa, sorted by type and name. In 2019, Iowa had a total summer capacity of 20,410 MW through all of its power plants, and a net generation of 61,674 GWh.  The corresponding electrical energy generation mix was 41.1% wind, 35.9% coal, 12.5% natural gas, 8.5% nuclear, 1.3% hydroelectric  0.4% petroleum, and 0.3% biomass.   Small-scale solar, which includes customer-owned photovoltaic panels, delivered an additional net 160 GWh to the state's electrical grid. This was ten times more than the 0.025% share of generation by Iowa's utility-scale photovoltaic plants.

Iowa has been among the top-five energy-consuming states, due in large part to its productive agriculture industry.  State regulators implemented the nation's first renewable portfolio standard (RPS) applied to investor-owned utilities in 1983.  The modest goal of 105 MW was soon met, and was exceeded nearly 100 times over by the end of 2019.  All electrical utility customers have had the option to support further expansion of renewable generation since 2004,  and regulators have also taken steps to encourage greater efficiency of energy use. Iowa has produced more electricity than it has consumed since 2008.

During 2019, wind power from about 5,100 turbines (10,200 MW) throughout Iowa generated 41% of electricity, which was the highest share among the United States.   Wind is a durable resource year-round and throughout the state, and trends mildest during summer months and in southeastern regions.  The historic 142 MW Keokuk hydroelectric station on the  Mississippi River is Iowa's longest serving facility since 1913.

Nuclear power stations

Fossil-fuel power stations
Data from the U.S. Energy Information Administration serves as a general reference.

Coal-fired plants
A useful map of active and retiring coal generation plants is provided by the Sierra Club.

Natural gas-fired plants
Many generating stations fueled by gas in Iowa are peaker plants that use simple cycle combustion turbines (SCCT).  Combined cycle combustion turbines (CCCT) and steam turbines (ST) alone may also be used for base load or peaking generation.

Renewable power stations
Data from the U.S. Energy Information Administration serves as a general reference.

Biomass

Hydroelectric plants

Wind farms

Solar farms

References

Lists of buildings and structures in Iowa
Power stations in Iowa
Iowa